Metaxa is a village located in Servia municipality, Kozani regional unit, in the Greek region of Macedonia. It is situated at an altitude of 1,060 meters above sea level. The postal code is 50500, while the telephone code is +30 24640. At the 2011 census the population was 226. 

The regional capital, Kozani, is 45 km away.

References

Populated places in Kozani (regional unit)